Florence Ndepele Mwachande Mumba (born in Mazabuka, Zambia in 1948), commonly referred to as Florence  Mumba, is a Zambian judge at the Extraordinary Chambers in the Courts of Cambodia, also known as the Khmer Rouge Tribunal or the Cambodia Tribunal. She has also previously served in the International Criminal Tribunal for the former Yugoslavia, the International Criminal Tribunal for Rwanda and as well as a Supreme Court Judge in Zambia.

Background and education
She was born in Mazabuka District, in the Southern Province of Zambia, in 1948. She graduated from the University of Zambia, School of Law, in 1972, with a Bachelor of Laws.

Work history in Zambia
In 1973 she went into private practice in Zambia, serving in that capacity until 1980. In October of that year, she was appointed as a High Court Judge in Zambia, being the first woman to serve in that capacity. She represented Zambia at the Conference on Women in 1985 and at the African Regional Conference on Women in 1994. She was appointed to ombudsman in 1989, which she remained, until she was appointed to the Supreme Court in Zambia in 1997.

Work history at the United Nations 
In 1992, as a member of the United Nations Commission on the Status of Women, she participated in drafting a resolution to the UN General Assembly, to have rape included as a war crime in the jurisdiction of war crimes tribunals. She served as a member of the International Ombudsman Institute Board from 1992 to 1996. From 1994 until 1996, she served as Vice-President of that board. From 1994 until 2003, she served as Commissioner on the International Commission of Jurists.

In 1997, she was elected Judge of the International Criminal Tribunal for the former Yugoslavia (ICTY), serving as Vice President of The ICTY from 1999 to 2001. From 2003 to 2005, she served on the Appeals Chamber of the International Criminal Tribunal for the former Yugoslavia and the International Criminal Tribunal for Rwanda (ICTY/ICTR). In 2009, she was appointed to the Extraordinary Chambers in the Courts of Cambodia, first as a Reserve Judge, and later as a full-time judge of Supreme Court Chamber of ECCC.

In November 2020, a panel of international lawyers chaired by Mumba and Philippe Sands drafted a proposed international law crimilalising ecocide, the destruction of ecosystems.

See also
 First women lawyers around the world
 Government of Zambia
 Judiciary of Zambia
 International Criminal Court
 Elizabeth Muyovwe

References

External links
 Website of the Supreme Court of Zambia

Living people
1948 births
People from Mazabuka District
University of Zambia alumni
International Court of Justice judges
20th-century Zambian judges
International Criminal Tribunal for the former Yugoslavia judges
Zambian women lawyers
International Criminal Tribunal for Rwanda judges
Khmer Rouge Tribunal judges
Ombudsmen
Zambian women judges
20th-century Zambian women
21st-century Zambian women
21st-century Zambian judges
Zambian judges of United Nations courts and tribunals